Fernando Antonio Guzmán Pérez Peláez (born 25 January 1956) is a Mexican politician affiliated with the National Action Party. As of 2014 he served as Deputy of the LIX Legislature of the Mexican Congress as a plurinominal representative.

References

1956 births
Living people
Politicians from Mexico City
Members of the Chamber of Deputies (Mexico)
National Action Party (Mexico) politicians
Escuela Libre de Derecho alumni
Academic staff of the Panamerican University
Members of the Congress of Jalisco
20th-century Mexican politicians
21st-century Mexican politicians
Deputies of the LIX Legislature of Mexico